Brian Arthur Nosek is an American social-cognitive psychologist, professor of psychology at the University of Virginia, and the co-founder and director of the Center for Open Science. He also co-founded the Society for the Improvement of Psychological Science and Project Implicit. He has been on the faculty of the University of Virginia since 2002.

Education
Nosek received his BS from California Polytechnic State University in 1995, and his MS, MPhil, and PhD from Yale University in 1998, 1999, and 2002, respectively.

Work
In 2011, Nosek and his collaborators set up the Reproducibility Project, with the aim of trying to replicate the results of 100 psychological experiments published in respected journals in 2008. In 2015, their results were published in Science, and found that only 36 out of the 100 replications showed statistically significant results, compared with 97 of the 100 original experiments. In 2014 Nosek was guest-editor of a special issue of the journal Social Psychology dedicated to the publication of preregistered replications.

Honors
In 2015, he was named one of "Nature's 10" by the scientific journal Nature. In 2018, Nosek was awarded, alongside Mahzarin Banaji and Anthony Greenwald, with a Golden Goose Award from the American Association for the Advancement of Science for their work on implicit bias.

See also
 Open science
 Metascience
 John Ioannidis

References

External links
The Experiment-experiment, a Planet Money podcast featuring Nosek

Living people
American social psychologists
University of Virginia faculty
California Polytechnic State University alumni
Yale University alumni
Fellows of the Association for Psychological Science
Year of birth missing (living people)